Events from the year 1986 in Scotland.

Incumbents 

 Secretary of State for Scotland and Keeper of the Great Seal – George Younger until 11 January; then Malcolm Rifkind

Law officers 
 Lord Advocate – Lord Cameron of Lochbroom
 Solicitor General for Scotland – Peter Fraser

Judiciary 
 Lord President of the Court of Session and Lord Justice General – Lord Emslie
 Lord Justice Clerk – Lord Ross
 Chairman of the Scottish Land Court – Lord Elliott

Events 
 24 March – Edinburgh–Bathgate line reopened to rail passengers.
 26 March – Kenny Dalglish becomes the first Scotland national football team player to be capped 100 times at senior level.
 April – Scottish Unionist Party established.
 8 May – 1986 Scottish regional elections, result in the Conservatives losing control of the two Regional Councils where they previously held a majority: Grampian and Tayside.
 24 July–2 August – Commonwealth Games held in Edinburgh.
  – the millionth council house to be sold under the right to buy scheme is sold to its tenants in Scotland, seven years after the scheme was launched in the United Kingdom.
 9 September –  launched at Govan, the largest passenger ship built on the Clyde (31785 GT) and last large passenger ship built in the U.K.
 26 October – bus deregulation in Great Britain: First Magic Bus (Stagecoach) operation, in Glasgow.
 6 November – 1986 British International Helicopters Chinook crash: 45 oil workers killed when a Chinook helicopter carrying them from the Brent oilfield crashes in Shetland.
 December – the St Kilda islands become the first World Heritage Site in Scotland.
 James Nelson, a confessed and convicted matricide, is ordained a minister of the Church of Scotland.
 Highland Wildlife Park taken over by Royal Zoological Society of Scotland.

Births 
 3 January – Allan Walker, footballer
 13 February – Jamie Murray, tennis player
 16 April – Paul di Resta, racing driver
 27 April – Hayley Mulheron, netball player
 12 May – Luke Douglas, Australian-Scottish rugby league player
 26 May – Fern Brady, stand-up comedian
 5 June – Charlotte Dobson, racing sailor
 18 June – Richard Madden, actor
 17 September – Sophie (Xeon), born Samuel Long, singer-songwriter and record producer (died 2021 in Greece)
 13 November – Kevin Bridges, stand-up comedian
 11 December – Kris Doolan, footballer

Deaths 
 21 September – Bill Simpson, actor (born 1931)

The arts
 28 March – BBC Scotland screens Bill Bryden's The Holy City, a retelling of the Easter story set in Glasgow.
 Robert Alan Jamieson's novel Thin Wealth and Shetland dialect poetry collection Shoormal are published.
 Gilded Balloon comedy venue in Edinburgh first opens.

See also 
 1986 in England
 1986 in Northern Ireland
 1986 in Wales

References 

 
Scotland
Years of the 20th century in Scotland
1980s in Scotland